Edgar Laverne Olson (October 19, 1937 – August 20, 2020) was an American politician in the state of Minnesota. He served in the Minnesota House of Representatives. Olson died on August 20, 2020 at Madison Health Hospital in Madison, Minnesota.

References

Democratic Party members of the Minnesota House of Representatives
1937 births
2020 deaths
People from Polk County, Minnesota
Farmers from Minnesota
North Dakota State University alumni